is a Japanese wrestler and two-time Olympic champion in freestyle wrestling. He is considered the greatest wrestler in the history of Oklahoma State University, being the only Cowboy wrestler to have gone undefeated for the entirety of his college career, winning three NCAA Championships. Uetake was inducted into the National Wrestling Hall of Fame in Stillwater, Oklahoma as a Distinguished Member in 1980. In 2005, he was inducted into the FILA Hall of Fame. He was inducted into the Oklahoma Sports Hall of Fame in 2015.

Life and career 
Uetake had originally hoped to learn judo, but was considered too light. He later went on to become a high school wrestling national champion in Japan. The commissioner of the Japanese Wrestling Federation sent Uetake to the Oklahoma State University as a promise to head coach Myron Roderick. Roderick considered him "by far the best wrestler he ever saw or coached". While at Oklahoma State, Uetake was a three-time undefeated NCAA Champion. Later, Uetake went back to Japan as a coach.

Olympics
Uetake competed at the 1964 Summer Olympics in Tokyo where he won a gold medal in Freestyle wrestling in the bantamweight class.

He also won a gold medal at the 1968 Summer Olympics. Despite suffering a separated shoulder in the second round while trailing 0-2, Uetake managed to even the score at 2-2 and ended up with the gold medal in the 57 kg division.

References

1943 births
Living people
Olympic wrestlers of Japan
Wrestlers at the 1964 Summer Olympics
Wrestlers at the 1968 Summer Olympics
Japanese male sport wrestlers
Olympic gold medalists for Japan
Olympic medalists in wrestling
Oklahoma State Cowboys wrestlers
American sportsmen
Medalists at the 1968 Summer Olympics
Medalists at the 1964 Summer Olympics
20th-century Japanese people